Sonauli is a large village in the district of Chapra. There is a canal on the west of the village. A small canal also runs through the border of the village in south. Many good roads run through the village. Roads in the village can be used in any season.

Inhabitants

About five thousand people live in the village. People of different communities live there, including Hindus and Muslims. The Hindus live in the eastern part and the Muslims in the western part of the village. The latter are generally cultivators. Some of them are also traders and some hold service under the Government. Most of the Hindus earn their bread by service and through agriculture. 

There are many educated men in the village. Some of them hold high offices under the Government. There are lawyers, doctors, professors. Many people from the village are in defence (Army, Air Force,Navy). Many of them live in towns. They come to the village only during holidays. Chhat pooja and Eid is the main festival of the village, and all villagers celebrate it collectively.

School 
there are 3 school for children 
1- IPS (IDEAL PUBLIC SCHOOL)
2- GREEN VALLEY SCHOOL
3- S.S ACADMEY
and GOV school

Village market

The village market is very small. There is a big market nearby. There is no hospital in the village, but there are three doctors and a poly clinic who work for the welfare of the village. There is a post office in the village. There are also arrangements for football and cricket games in the village.

one of he best location green and clean village

References

Villages in Saran district